Elmos Semiconductor SE is a German manufacturer of semiconductor products headquartered in Dortmund, North Rhine-Westphalia, Germany. 
Elmos supplies automotive application-specific integrated circuits (ASICs).

Processes
Elmos has four high voltage CMOS processes available.

L12/T12 1.2 um CMOS/SOI process.  Voltage capability to 120 V/+/-120 V
L08 0.8 um CMOS process.  Voltage capability to 120 V
L05 0.5 um CMOS process.  Voltage capability to 120 V
L035/T035 0.35 um CMOS/SOI process. Voltage capability to 120 V/+/-120 V

History
1984 - Founded in Dortmund, Germany
1985 - 32 employees, 0.4 M DM turnover, Installation of 4" Wafer Fab in Dortmund
1994 - DIN ISO 9001 certificate
1998 - 460 employees, 140 M DM turnover. Complete supply from new 6" line
1999 - IPO to new market, Frankfurt
2001 - 630 employees, 107 million Euro turnover Acquisition of Eurasem (Packaging, NL) and SMI (MEMS, USA)
2002 - TS16949
2005 - Opened 8" wafer fab in Duisburg as second production line
2020 - Conversion of legal form into a Societas Europaea
2022 - media reports about possible Chinese takeover which the German government eventually vetoed

Details
Yearly production and supply of more than 100 million ICs
Currently >1.5 Billion ELMOS ICs "in the field"
More than 1,100 employees at 13 locations, turnover about 160.7 Million. ASSPs, MEMS and Microsystems
Target 2010: Yearly production of approx. 200 M ICs with circa 250 M Euro turnover

Silicon Microstructures
Silicon Microstructures, Inc.(SMI)  was founded in 1991 as a commercial source of high-performance silicon pressure sensors, including Microelectromechanical systems sensors, and accelerometers. Its first product was a silicon sensor for very low-pressure usage.  SMI was acquired in March 2001 from OSI Systems.
SMI began production on higher performance, system level sensors and microstructures, wireless, RF and bus addressable microstructures.
In August 2002, SMI acquired the IC Sensors' wafer fabrication operations and wafer R&D group and relocated to Milpitas, California. The following year, Silicon Microstructures undertook a significant and complete wafer fabrication upgrade to expand the facility for full 6" wafer handling.

This facility processed primarily 6 inch wafers and has advanced technical capabilities including deep reactive ion etching (DRIE) and plasma enhanced fusion bonding.

References

External links
Elmos Semiconductor website
Silicon Microstructures website

Electronics companies of Germany
Equipment semiconductor companies
Manufacturing companies based in Dortmund
Electronics companies established in 1984
German brands